Dad's Week Off is an American television film that premiered on Showtime on March 29, 1997. It was written and directed by Neal Israel, and starred Henry Winkler, Olivia d'Abo and Richard Jeni.

Plot
A computer salesman charged with marketing a tiny computer that no one can operate, faces hypertension when he realizes that there is no way to sell the product and he is likely to lose his job. So he can get some rest, his wife offers to take their two kids camping for a week. When his fellow salesman and best friend is fired and thrown out of his house by his wife, he moves in and immediately starts unending parties, which ultimately ends up the house on fire and Winkler arrested on multiple charges. In between, in a drug-induced stupor, he gets mixed up with a ditzy blonde who wants to marry him, and rescue her child from being raised by her parents.

Cast
 Henry Winkler - Jack Potter
 Olivia d'Abo - Cherice
 Richard Jeni - Bernie
 Justin Louis - Chip
 Ken Pogue - Emmett Sharpel
 Wendel Meldrum - Lew
 Don S. Davis - Hank
 Colleen Winton - Gayle Sharpel
 Miguelito Macario Andaluz - Lew
 Yee Jee Tso - Kea
 Jerry Wasserman - Detective
 Christine Willes - Alice
 Adrian Hughes - Brother #2, Bob
 John R. Taylor - Minister
 Will Sasso - Pete
 Laurie McLay - Pauline
 Mark Acheson - Sobbing Man
 Robert Frederick - Sandy the Lawyer
 Michael Kopsa - Cop
 Lossen Chambers - Lolita
 Fred Henderson - Doctor
 Eric Pospisil - Nicholas
 Kaitlyn Burke - Rebecca
 Patrick Pon - Fang Leader
 Don MacKay - Mr. Mendelson
 Charles Siegel - Sam
 Ernie Prentice - Old Golf Man
 April Telek - Bikini Girl
 Ken Lowther - Uncle Morty

References

External links
 
 
 

1997 television films
1997 films
American television films
National Lampoon films
Films directed by Neal Israel
1997 comedy films
Films with screenplays by Neal Israel
Films about salespeople
1990s American films